Kathleen Smith may refer to:
Kathleen Smith (archer) British paralympian
Kathleen Smith (cricketer) (1927–1998), English cricketer
Clara Kathleen Smith, poet from New Brunswick, Canada

See also
Kathy Smith (disambiguation)
Katie Smith (disambiguation)